Calm at Sea is a 2011 German / French drama film directed by Volker Schlöndorff. The film depicts the events leading to the 1941 execution of a group of French communists, including the 17-year-old Guy Môquet, as retaliation for the assassination of a German officer by the French resistance.

Cast
  as Guy Môquet
 Marc Barbé as Jean-Pierre Timbaud
 Ulrich Matthes as Ernst Jünger
  as Lucien Touya
 Sébastien Accart as Bernard Lecornu
  as Claude Lalet
 Jacob Matschenz as Soldat Otto

Criticism 
The sea in the morning was mostly positively received. Jörg Schöning sums it up in Der Spiegel: “Schlöndorff's film, which is not particularly interested in the more recent questions of humanity, thankfully concentrates on the concrete. The sea in the morning is the stroke of luck of a documentary game: the people, their actions and words are historically documented, the consequences of their actions are highly dramatic - and still trigger considerable emotions today.”

Filmgazette editor Wolfgang Nierlins judged: "Schlöndorff's film shows the fateful course of events, relentlessly aggravated by human arbitrariness and blind coincidence as a tragic event." He understands The Sea in the Morning as “a differentiated plea for humanity” and awards 8 out of 10 possible stars.

References

External links 
 
 

2011 war drama films
2011 films
German war drama films
French war drama films
2010s German-language films
2010s French-language films
Films directed by Volker Schlöndorff
Films set in 1941
World War II films based on actual events
Films about the French Resistance
2011 drama films
2011 multilingual films
French multilingual films
German multilingual films
2010s French films
2010s German films